Ryszard Wójcik (born 6 June 1956) is a retired Polish football referee who is best known for refereeing a match at the 1998 FIFA World Cup and two at the 1991 FIFA World Youth Championship in Portugal.

He was born in Opole in 1956 and refereed over 300 matches in the Polish Football League. In 1991, he refereed two matches at the FIFA World Youth Championship - a group stage match between Brazil and the Ivory Coast which ended 2-1 and a further quarter-final in which Portugal defeated Mexico 2-1.

In 1998 he was selected to referee in that year's World Cup in France as a UEFA representative. He refereed one match - a group match between the Netherlands and South Korea which the Dutch won 5-0.

He also refereed the 1999 UEFA Super Cup, which Lazio won 1-0. Amongst others, he has refereed matches in the UEFA Champions League. He retired in 2002.

External links
 Profile

1956 births
Sportspeople from Opole
Living people
Polish football referees
FIFA World Cup referees
1998 FIFA World Cup referees